The World Day of the Sick is an awareness day, or observance, in the Catholic Church intended for "prayer and sharing, of offering one's suffering for the good of the Church and of reminding everyone to see in his sick brother or sister the face of Christ". The day was instituted on 13 May 1992 by Pope John Paul II and is celebrated on 11 February, also the memorial of Our Lady of Lourdes.  The Day is not a liturgical celebration.

History
Pope John Paul II had been diagnosed with Parkinson's disease as early as 1991, an illness which was only confirmed in 2001, and it is significant that he decided to create the World Day of the Sick only one year after his diagnosis. The pope had written a great deal on the topic of suffering and believed that it was very much a salvific and redeeming process through Christ, as he indicated in his apostolic letter Salvifici Doloris.

He chose the memorial of Our Lady of Lourdes for the date of the observance because many pilgrims and visitors to Lourdes, France, have been reported to have been healed at the Marian Sanctuary there through the intercession of the Blessed Virgin. The pope also venerated the sanctuary of Harissa in Lebanon.

In 2005, the World Day of the Sick had a special significance since the ailing pope later died on 2 April of that year. Many people had gathered in St. Peter's Square in Rome to pray for him as he lay dying.

In 2013, Pope Benedict XVI announced his resignation on this day, and he gave his declining health as his reason for retiring.

References

External links
 World Day of the Sick resources via the NACC

Catholic holy days
Health awareness days
Pope John Paul II
February observances